ClassRanked is an American educational technology company based in Salt Lake City, UT that offers higher education enterprise software (SaaS) solutions for course evaluation, reporting, and survey management.

The company was founded at Duke University as a data-centric platform aiding students with course registration and subsequently shifted focus to building software for colleges and universities in 2022.

Company history

Origins and growth

ClassRanked was conceived of at Duke University by Hayden Hall, Max Labaton, and Dilan Trivedi in their junior year. While registering for classes, they spent hours searching to fulfill academic requirements. Hall proposed building a site to streamline and automate this process. Hall then coded and developed a website that combined course evaluations, grade distribution data, and user reviews to offer students with comprehensive rankings of courses.

ClassRanked was initially launched at Duke University. Within its first two days, the site had generated over 5,000 page views. By the end of its first week, ClassRanked had over 1,200 user reviews and within a month was being actively used by over 80% of Duke’s student body.

By the end of August 2019, ClassRanked announced its expansion to University of Pennsylvania, UC Berkeley, UNC-Chapel Hill, and Emory University. As of April 2021, the company had expanded over 400 colleges and universities with data from courses taught by more than 300,000 faculty members.

SaaS product expansion
The company announced in 2022 that it was shifting resources and focus to building higher education enterprise software (SaaS) solutions for course evaluation, reporting, and survey management. The new software platform was rolled out nationwide to universities the following year.

Features

The website provides ratings of classes at colleges and universities ranked by quality and difficulty.

In November 2019, the company announced it had added a new feature allowing students to upload course syllabi to view grade distribution breakdowns and required textbooks for potential classes. ClassRanked also worked directly with colleges to gain grade distributions for classes. That data is integrated into course rankings and displayed with bar graphs so users can see comprehensive grade history for a class.

References 

American review websites
Educational personnel assessment and evaluation
Educational technology companies of the United States
Education companies of the United States
American educational websites
Companies based in Raleigh, North Carolina
Software companies of the United States